Jordan Mackenzie Smith (born November 4, 1993) is an American singer, songwriter, and musician from Harlan, Kentucky. Smith began singing in his church choir and continued through his college education at Lee University.

In 2015 he gained national recognition when he won season 9 of the singing competition The Voice. During his time on The Voice he was the show's 1st artist of the season to reach No. 1 in sales of pop songs in the iTunes Store, and set new sales marks on Billboard charts. In 2022, he represented Kentucky on the American Song Contest with the song, "Sparrow", finishing 3rd place.

Early life
Jordan Smith was born on November 4, 1993,  in Whitley County, Kentucky, to Kelley and Geri Smith (née Saylor), both of whom are musicians. They raised him in the church choir at a young age, in the congregation of House of Mercy in the town of Wallins Creek, Kentucky. Smith graduated from Harlan County High School.

In 2012, he won the Poke Sallet Idol competition at the annual Poke Sallet festival.

Smith attended Lee University in Cleveland, Tennessee, and was a member of the Lee University Singers.

Career

The Voice (2015)
Smith came to national attention in 2015 during his participation on season nine of The Voice. His audition performance of "Chandelier" led all four coaches to turn their chairs; Smith chose to be part of Adam Levine's team after Levine told him, "I think you're the most important person that's ever been on this show."

Smith had auditioned for the show once before and was rejected. Even when he was accepted for the show, he had his doubts until the reactions started pouring in. "I [thought], 'Wow, people see something in me that honestly I didn't think was there.' I thought maybe I had fooled everyone! It took a lot of convincing for me to finally start seeing myself as a performer and artist." Smith said it was his performance of "Halo" during the live playoffs that allowed him to believe he had "something to say as an artist". According to Slate, Smith was dubbed "the unicorn" during the show because his voice is "genderless and expansive ... as ambiguous as it is precise, quickly scaling and spelunking through octaves, never anything but perfectly on pitch."

For week two of the live shows, Smith began "Great Is Thy Faithfulness" by singing a cappella, then accompanied himself on piano; the performance made Smith the first artist of the season to reach No. 1 in sales in the iTunes Store, ahead of "Hello" by Adele. "Great Is Thy Faithfulness" landed on the Billboard magazine charts as well; it placed at No. 30 on the Hot 100, and was No. 1 on the Christian Songs chart for two straight weeks. He was again No. 1 on Christian Songs with his recording of "Hallelujah", which entered the Hot 100 chart at No. 61.

Smith chose Queen's "Somebody to Love" for his semi-final song. After the performance, Levine commented, "I don't need to say anything at all because that's one of the best things I've ever seen in my entire life." Within 30 minutes, the single was the best selling song in the iTunes Store, knocking "Hello" from the top spot for a second time.

"Mary, Did You Know?" was Smith's choice for the final competition show. It became his second consecutive performance to reach the top of the iTunes Store, bumping "Hello" a third time. For the results finale, Smith teamed up with Usher and sang David Guetta's "Without You". At the end of the broadcast, Smith was declared the winner of season nine, earning US$100,000 and a Republic Records recording contract.

  Studio version of performance reached the top 10 on iTunes

Non-competition performances

After The Voice
As of December 2015, Jordan Smith was the highest selling artist ever to compete on The Voice. One week after his victory, Smith made history on Billboards Christian Songs chart; he became the first artist ever to hold the top two positions concurrently when his cover of "Mary, Did You Know?" overtook "Hallelujah" as the No. 1 song. Smith's version of "Great Is Thy Faithfulness" occupied the No. 8 spot at the same time, making him only the third artist ever to chart three songs in the top 10 simultaneously.

The Voice: Jordan Smith: The Complete Season 9 Collection was released in December 2015, entering the Billboard 200 albums chart at No. 11, earning "Hot Shot Debut" honors. Two tracks from the album debuted in the top ten on the Digital Singles chart; "Mary, Did You Know?" debuted at No. 1.

Upon his return to Kentucky, Smith was named a Kentucky Colonel by the Secretary of State, at a parade in Smith's honor. He was also named the 2015 Kentucky Monthly Kentuckian of the Year. Harlan County Judge-Executive Dan Mosley said Smith's win had a huge impact on an area that is struggling to rebuild its economy. "Jordan may have single-handedly reversed negative stereotypes on our region that will help give us an economic bump. In January 2016, Smith was announced as grand marshal of the Kentucky Derby Festival Pegasus Parade in May. That same month, he performed the national anthem alongside the Boston Pops Orchestra at the 2016 NHL Winter Classic at Gillette Stadium in Foxborough, Massachusetts featuring the Montreal Canadiens and Boston Bruins.

On January 6, 2016, Smith performed "You Are So Beautiful" alongside David Foster at the 42nd People's Choice Awards. During Smith's introduction, it was announced that The Voice took its third consecutive Favorite Competition TV Show award.

The track listing for Smith's debut album was announced in February 2016; Something Beautiful was released on March 18, debuted at No. 2 in sales in the iTunes Store, and took the top spot on March 22. iTunes' staff praised Smith's "fearless, confident singing, which elevates even the simplest phrases into stirring statements". Jake's Take offered a B+ grade for "the connection that Jordan had with each and every individual track that is on Something Beautiful. I hope that for his sophomore attempt, Jordan and the Republic Records team find high quality original material" for Smith. The Knoxville News Sentinel gave the album three stars (out of five) for its "entirely too cautious" approach and "safe but beautiful" songs. Smith's take on "You Are So Beautiful" is "embarrassingly sterilized"; his cover of "Beautiful", however, "is the album highlight as he taps into the life-affirming lyrics with touching gentleness". Brittany Frederick of AXS wrote, "Voice fans who purchase the record won't be disappointed... but it still feels like the real Jordan Smith has yet to stand up."

On May 3, 2018, Jordan Smith announced via his Instagram account that he wrote "Ashes" for the Deadpool 2 soundtrack, which was performed by Celine Dion. On March 28, 2022, Smith debuted an original song, "Sparrow", on American Song Contest, where he represented the state of Kentucky. He placed 3rd in the Grand Final.

Personal life
Smith proposed marriage to girlfriend Kristen Denny on January 1, 2016. "She's been there every step of the way," he said. They were married on June 25, 2016, in Middlesboro, Kentucky.

Discography

Studio albums

Singles

Other charted songs

Releases from The Voice

Albums

Competition singles

Notes

References

External links
 
 Jordan Smith The Voice artist profile

1993 births
20th-century Christians
21st-century American male writers
21st-century American pianists
21st-century American singers
21st-century Christians
21st-century American male singers
American Christians
American gospel singers
American male pianists
American male pop singers
American male singer-songwriters
American performers of Christian music
American pop pianists
Christian music songwriters
Christians from Kentucky
Christians from Tennessee
Gospel music pianists
Lee University alumni
Living people
People from Harlan, Kentucky
People from Whitley County, Kentucky
Performers of contemporary Christian music
Republic Records artists
Singer-songwriters from Kentucky
Singer-songwriters from Tennessee
The Voice (franchise) winners
American Song Contest contestants